USCGC Raymond Evans is the tenth vessel in the United States Coast Guard's  cutter.
All the vessels are named after members of the Coast Guard, or its precursor services, who are remembered for their heroism.
Names had already been assigned for the first fourteen vessels, when Commander Raymond Evans died, and the USCG Commandant announced that the next Sentinel class cutter would be named after him. Joseph Napier, who was originally scheduled to be the namesake of the tenth vessel, had his name moved to the beginning of the second list of heroes names, and will now be the namesake of the fifteenth vessel.

The vessel was delivered to the Coast Guard, for pre-commissioning trials, on June 25, 2014.
On August 20, 2014, an open house was held to allow residents of Key West, Florida to tour the vessel.
The vessel was commissioned on September 6, 2014.

Design
The  cutters were designed to replace the shorter  s. Raymond Evans is equipped with a remote-control 25 mm Bushmaster autocannon and four, crew-served M2HB .50-caliber machine guns. It has a bow thruster for maneuvering in crowded anchorages and channels. It also has small underwater fins for coping with the rolling and pitching caused by large waves. It has a complement of twenty-two crew members. Like the Marine Protector class, and the cancelled extended Island-class cutters, the Sentinel-class cutters deploy the Short Range Prosecutor Rigid-hulled inflatable (SRP or RHIB) in rescues and interceptions.

Career 
In early January, while operating off the coast of Guyana with USCGC Stone (WMSL-758), Raymond Evans boarded a suspected narcotics trafficking vessel. After testing the packages found onboard, 970 kilograms of cocaine were recovered and the suspected traffickers were detained.

References 

2014 ships
Sentinel-class cutters
Ships built in Lockport, Louisiana